Political funding in the United Kingdom has been a source of controversy for many years. Political parties in the UK may be funded through membership fees, party donations or through state funding, the latter of which is reserved for administrative costs. The general restrictions in the UK were held in Bowman v United Kingdom to be fully compatible with the European Convention on Human Rights, article 10.

History
The first effort to regulate the financial dimension of political competition was the Corrupt and Illegal Practices Prevention Act 1883. Although this landmark legislation was concerned with constituency candidates, their campaign expenses and their agents only, all other efforts to create a political finance regime started from here.
Edward 16
The next legislative step to deal with the subject was the Honours (Prevention of Abuses) Act 1925 that sought to end the selling of titles in exchange for donations to political parties.

In August 1976 the Committee on Financial Aid to Political Parties, chaired by Lord Houghton of Sowerby, proposed that financial aid to political parties should be given in two forms:
(a) general grants to the central organisations for their general purposes and 
(b) a limited reimbursement of election expenses to parliamentary and local government candidates.

Starting in 2006, political funding came under scrutiny as concerns grew that the largest British political parties were too dependent on a handful of wealthy donors. Furthermore, during the Cash for Honours scandal, concern grew even more. A concern of the 1970s had been that the major parties were unable to raise sufficient funds to operate successfully.

The Political Parties, Elections and Referendums Act 2000

The Political Parties, Elections and Referendums Act 2000 (PPERA) was an act that established the Electoral Commission and required all political parties to register with it, set down accounting requirements for political parties, and introduced controls on donations.

2006 Sir Hayden Phillips inquiry
In March 2006, former civil servant Sir Hayden Phillips was charged with setting up an inquiry to come up with proposal for reform. It reported a year later. He recommended capping individual donations at £50,000 and capping spending for political campaigns. He also suggested increasing state funding by £25m and expanding its reach.

2008 Ministry of Justice report
In June 2008, the Ministry of Justice released a white paper analyzing party finance and expenditure. The paper proposed to tighten controls on spending by parties and candidates, substantially strengthen the powers of the Electoral Commission, and increase the transparency of donations.

2011 Committee on Standards in Public Life report
In November 2011 the Committee on Standards on Public Life, chaired by Sir Christopher Kelly, published a Report on "Political Party Finance. Ending the big donor culture". It is their 13th report, Cm. 8208. The report made five main recommendations: (a) Contribution limit of GBP10,000 per donor, party and year; (b) this limit should not apply to affiliated trade union affiliation fees if such fees are raised by an "opt in"; (c) existing limits for campaign spending should be cut by about 15 percent; (d) in addition to the present "policy development grant" eligible parties should be granted public funding at the rate of GBP3.00 per vote in Westminster elections and GBP 1.50 per vote in devolved and European elections; (e) income tax relief should be available for donations up to GBP 1,000 and membership fees to political parties.

Membership subscriptions
Membership subscriptions ("subs") provide one source of funding for political parties.  However, in recent times membership has declined and campaign costs have grown.

The Green Party is the only major political party in the UK which receives the majority of its funding through membership fees and these are what cover the running costs of the organisation. Membership subs have become a more significant source in income for both the SNP and Labour in recent years, as both have seen substantial increases in membership.

Donations
The Conservative Party relies on donations mostly from individuals and companies; as well as these sources the Labour Party receives a significant portion of its donations from trade unions. For example, in the third quarter of 2009, eighteen political parties reported donations totalling £9,532,598 (excluding public funds). The Conservative Party received £5,269,186, the Labour party received £3,045,377 and the Liberal Democrats received £816,663. Donations typically peak before elections.  Between 6 April and 6 May 2010 (a general election campaign month) the Conservatives took £7,317,602, Labour £5,283,199 and the Liberal Democrats £724,000.

State funding
Opposition parties receive state funding to pay administration cost; Short Money in the House of Commons starting in 1975, and Cranborne Money in the House of Lords starting in 1996 however, there is no state funding available to parties for campaign purposes.

In addition there is a general policy development grant available to parties with two MPs or one MP and one MEP.

Transparency
Donations worth over £7,500 to national parties must be declared, as must be donations worth £1,500 or more to local associations. Donations to members' associations – groups whose members are primarily or entirely members of a single political party – also need to be declared above £7,500. This produces a loophole where donors can donate larger sums to local candidates while remaining anonymous, by channeling those donations through a members' association such as the United and Cecil Club.

For a while, as a loophole, loans did not have to be declared.

Northern Ireland political parties are exempt from revealing the identity of party donors due to security reasons.

See also

National
Cash for Honours
Cash for Influence
Constitutional Research Council
Cranborne Money
Short Money
Labour Leader's Office Fund
Affiliated trade union
Labour party proxy and undeclared donations (2007)
Party political broadcast
Peter Watt
Midlands Industrial Council
Cash-for-questions affair
Honours (Prevention of Abuses) Act 1925

References

Further reading
 Houghton Report - Report of the Committee on Financial Aid to Political Parties (Chairman: Lord Houghton of Sowerby), London: H.M.S.O, 1976 (Cmnd. 6601)
 Michael Pinto-Duschinsky: British Political Finance, 1830-1980, Washington, DC: American Enterprise Institute, 1981
 Neill Report - The Funding of Political Parties in the United Kingdom (Fifth Report of the Committee on Standards in Public Life, Chairman: Lord Neill of Bladen), London: H.M.S.O., 1998 (Cm. 4057)
 Johnston, Ronald J./ Pattie, Charles J.: 'The Impact of Spending on Party Constituency Campaigns at Recent British General Elections', in: Party Politics, vol. 1, 1995, no. 1, pp. 261–274.
 Keith D. Ewing, The Cost of Democracy. Party Funding in Modern British Politics; Hart Publishing, Oxford, 2007; 9781841137162
 Kelly Report - Committee on Standards in Public Life, Chair: Sir Christopher Kelly KCB, Thirteenth Report, Political party finance. Ending the big donor culture, Cm. 8208, 
 A. Mell, S. Radford, S. Thevoz, "Is There a Market for Peerages", Oxford Discussion paper , 2015
 J. Rowbottom, Democracy Distorted. Wealth, Influence and Democratic Politics; Cambridge University Press, Cambridge, 2010; 9780521700177

External links
 http://www.idea.int/political-finance/country.cfm?id=77
 http://www.idea.int/publications/funding-of-political-parties-and-election-campaigns/upload/foppec-p8.pdf